The Raso da Catarina is an ecoregion in the caatinga biome of Bahia and Pernambuco, Brazil. It is a sandstone plateau, much eroded, that is extremely dry for most of the year. Vegetation includes low bushes, often thorny, cacti and bromeliads.

Location

The core of the Raso da Caterina roughly corresponds to a rectangle bounded by the São Francisco River to the north, BR-110 to the east, Vaza-Barris River to the south and BR-116 to the west.
It contains the communities of Cocorobó in the southwest and Paulo Afonso in the northeast, and holds the Serra Branca in the south.
The core Raso da Caterina is a sandstone plateau that dates back to the Cretaceous.
The landscape has many canyons and rocks carved by erosion into huge obelisks.

In a broader sense the Raso da Catarina Ecoregion comprises portions of the states of Pernambuco and Bahia in a long and narrow north-south strip in the central-eastern part of the biome. 
It covers  defined by the natural geomorphological limits of the Tucano-Jatoba sedimentary basin.
It has deep soils, excessively drained, acidic and very low fertility.
In Bahia it includes parts of the municipalities of Canudos, Cícero Dantas, Chorrochó, Euclides da Cunha, Glória, Jeremoabo, Macururé, Paulo Afonso, Ribeira do Pombal, Rodelas, Santa Brígida and Uauá.

Environment

The region is located in the driest part of the state of Bahia, classified as a transition zone between the arid and semi-arid regions.
The Raso da Catarina is one of eight ecoregions of the caatinga domain in the Tucano-Jatobá sedimentary basin.
It is in the east-central portion of the area, characterized by a markedly seasonal climate that has severe for drought ten to eleven months of the year.

The Köppen climate classification is mostly Bsh, with very irregular rainfall, high temperatures and strong evaporation.
Full-size trees are rare. The vegetation is denser and less spiny than caatinga on crystalline soils.

History

The War of Canudos, led by the religious preacher Antônio Conselheiro, caused a confrontation between peasants and republican troops.
Between 1896 and 1897 about 30,000 people died in the slaughter.
Many of the relics of that time are now submerged by the Cocorobó Dam.
Later the outlaw "Lampião" (Virgulino Ferreira), also known as the "King of Cangaço", found shelter in the region.

Conservation

The region is considered a priority areas for conservation, sustainable use and sharing of the benefits of biodiversity in the Caatinga Ecological Corridor, established in 2006.
Conservation units in the region include:

Notes

Sources

Ecoregions of Brazil